The Tampere Convention (fully entitled The Tampere Convention on the Provision of Telecommunication Resources for Disaster Mitigation and Relief Operations) is a multilateral treaty governing the provision and availability of communications equipment during disaster relief operations, particularly as regards the transport of radio and related equipment over international boundaries by radio amateurs. It was concluded at the First Intergovernmental Conference on Emergency Telecommunications (ICET-98) in Tampere, Finland, in 1998, and went into effect on 8 January 2005. As of September 2014, there are 48 state parties to the agreement.

The first treaty of its kind, the convention was conceived primarily as a means to influence party states to pursue a set of common expectations regarding freedom and access of persons providing emergency services in disaster situations. Hindrances to the deployment of telecommunications equipment and operators across borders have cost lives in past disasters.

Issues pertinent to the jurisdiction of the Tampere Convention are discussed at the Global Amateur Radio Emergency Communications Conference (GAREC), which is held yearly at different international locations.

References

External links
 The Tampere Convention full text in English, French and Spanish.
 Signatories and ratifications.
 The Tampere Declaration on Disaster Communications

Emergency management
Treaties concluded in 1998
Treaties entered into force in 2005
1998 in Finland
United Nations treaties
Treaties of Albania
Treaties of Argentina
Treaties of Armenia
Treaties of Barbados
Treaties of Belgium
Treaties of Bulgaria
Treaties of Burundi
Treaties of Canada
Treaties of Colombia
Treaties of Cyprus
Treaties of the Czech Republic
Treaties of Denmark
Treaties of Dominica
Treaties of El Salvador
Treaties of Finland
Treaties of France
Treaties of Guinea
Treaties of Hungary
Treaties of Iceland
Treaties of India
Treaties of Ireland
Treaties of Kenya
Treaties of Kuwait
Treaties of Lebanon
Treaties of Liberia
Treaties of Liechtenstein
Treaties of Lithuania
Treaties of Luxembourg
Treaties of Montenegro
Treaties of Morocco
Treaties of the Netherlands
Treaties of Nicaragua
Treaties of Oman
Treaties of Pakistan
Treaties of Panama
Treaties of Peru
Treaties of Romania
Treaties of Slovakia
Treaties of Spain
Treaties of Sri Lanka
Treaties of Saint Vincent and the Grenadines
Treaties of Sweden
Treaties of Switzerland
Treaties of Tonga
Treaties of Uganda
Treaties of the United Kingdom
Treaties of Uruguay
Treaties of Venezuela
Telecommunications treaties
Treaties extended to the Netherlands Antilles
Treaties extended to Greenland
Treaties extended to the Faroe Islands
Treaties extended to Aruba